Emanuel Fernandez (born July 27, 1954) is an American professional wrestler, better known by his ring name, "The Raging Bull" Manny Fernandez.

Early life 
Fernandez played American football for West Texas A&M University.

Professional wrestling career 
Fernandez had success in 1979, becoming Florida Heavyweight Champion after a feud with Terry Funk. He also formed a tag team with Dusty Rhodes, and they won the NWA World tag team title from Ivan Koloff and Don Kernodle. They feuded with them and Ivan's "nephew" Nikita Koloff until losing the title to the Koloffs in early 1985.

Fernandez soon became involved in a feud with Arn Anderson after being attacked by Anderson and laid out. He teamed with Thunderbolt Patterson to feud with Arn and Ole Anderson.

In late 1985, he started helping Jimmy Valiant in his war against Paul Jones and his "Army". He formed a team with Valiant called the "B and B Connection" ("Boogie Woogie" and "Bull"). He had some matches against Abdullah the Butcher and The Barbarian. He also formed a tag team with Hector Guerrero in 1986 called The Latin Connection. In the summer of 1986, Fernandez accepted Jones' money and turned on Valiant starting a feud between the two. Later in the year, Jones also brought in Rick Rude. Pairing Fernandez and Rude together, the duo defeated The Rock 'n' Roll Express for the NWA World tag team title. They feuded with the Express and kept the titles until June 1987 when Rude left the promotion, which was resolved with a "phantom title change". Fernandez & Chavo Guerrero came to CWA in Memphis in 1987.

Fernandez teamed with Ivan Koloff for the rest of the summer and left for the Mid-Southern promotion in late 1987. Later on worked for New Japan Pro-Wrestling from 1987 to 1989. He was soon in the American Wrestling Association (AWA) feuding with Wahoo McDaniel after he attacked Wahoo and destroyed his headdress. The two veterans, who had feuded briefly in the NWA, engaged in an "Indian Strap match" at the AWA pay-per-view Super Clash III. After that feud ended in late 1988, Fernandez headed to Puerto Rico's World Wrestling Council (WWC) where he stayed through 1991 and then he headed to the independent circuit. Fernandez sparked controversy in the WWC in 1989 when he wrestled Invader #3. During the match, Fernandez landed a knee drop off the top rope to Invader #3's midsection; the impact apparently ruptured Invader #3's stomach cavity, causing him to vomit blood all over the ring while Fernandez landed two more knee drops. There have been debates on whether Invader #3's injury was a work, with some theorizing that the incident came about due to real life bad blood between Fernandez and Jose Gonzalez, the booker of WWC who was acquitted of murdering Bruiser Brody earlier that year. Others say the blood was a combination of pig's blood and vodka.  In an interview with Bill Apter, Fernandez claimed that it was not a work and deliberately injured Jose as a way to avenge the death of Bruiser Brody, though his match with Gonzalez took place nearly 2 months prior to Brody's death in July of the same year.

From 1993 to 1994 he worked for International World Class Championship Wrestling. Manny won the APW Universal Heavyweight Championship defeating Robert Thompson on March 8, 1997. He would vacate the title when he left APW on June 8. He would feud with Rick Link in 1998. He defeated Link for NDW Heavyweight Championship on December 2, 1998, until dropping the title back to Link ten days later. He lost to Jimmy Snuka at NDW in Charleston, West Virginia on August 14, 1999.

He defeated Nikolai Volkoff at NWA New Jersey on May 20, 2000.

On December 5, 2002, he lost to Mexican legend Mil Mascaras at LWE Explosion in Fort Worth, Texas.

On February 25, 2011, he teamed up with George South to compete in The Anderson Brothers Classic 5 Tournament where they George South Jr. and Louis Moore; Deon Johnson and Black Angel; and lost in the finals to The Rock 'n' Roll Express.

Then he teamed with Jimmy Valiant to defeat George South and The Masked Superstar at WreslteCade 2012 on November 11, 2012. On November 30, 2013, he wrestled at WrestleCade 2013 teaming with George South in a Tag Team battle royal won by Caprice Coleman and Cedric Alexander. Afterwards he retired from wrestling.

In 2017 he came out of retirement, where he continues to wrestle in the indies. Since 2018 he's been working with IWA Mid-South. He lost to Michael Elgin on February 15, 2018.

He defeated Pablo Marquez in a bull rope match at UXW on February 23, 2019, in Orlando, Florida. Then on May 30, 2019, he lost to Kongo Kong at IWA Mid-South.

On March 12, 2021, Fernandez launched a self-biographical podcast entitled "No BS With the Bull".

Championships and accomplishments 
All Pro Wrestling
APW Universal Heavyweight Championship (1 time)
Lucha Xtreme
LX United States Champion (1 time)
Central States Wrestling
NWA Central States Heavyweight Championship (1 time)
Championship Wrestling from Florida
NWA Florida Heavyweight Championship (1 time)
NWA Florida Television Championship (1 time)
Continental Wrestling Association
CWA International Heavyweight Championship (1 time)
Eastern States Wrestling / Eastern Shores Wrestling
ESW Heavyweight Championship (1 time)
International Wrestling Association
IWA Heavyweight Championship (1 time)
Mid-Atlantic Championship Wrestling
NWA Brass Knuckles Championship (Mid-Atlantic version) (1 time)
NWA World Tag Team Championship (Mid-Atlantic version) (2 times) - with Dusty Rhodes (1) and Rick Rude (1)
Pro Wrestling Illustrated
PWI ranked him # 188 of the 500 best singles wrestlers during the "PWI Years" in 2003.
PWI ranked him # 88 of the 100 best tag teams during the "PWI Years" with Dusty Rhodes.
Southwest Championship Wrestling
SCW Southwest Brass Knuckles Championship (1 time)
SCW Southwest Heavyweight Championship (1 time)
SCW Southwest Tag Team Championship (2 times) - with Chavo Guerrero Sr. (1) and Al Perez (1)
SCW World Tag Team Championship (1 time) - with Chavo Guerrero Sr.
World Wrestling Council
WWC North American Heavyweight Championship (1 time)
WWC Puerto Rico Heavyweight Championship (1 time)

References

External links 
 
 SLAM! Sports Wrestling - Manny Fernandez still a raging bull

1954 births
American male professional wrestlers
American professional wrestlers of Mexican descent
Living people
People from El Paso, Texas
Professional wrestlers from Texas
Professional wrestling trainers
West Texas A&M Buffaloes football players
20th-century professional wrestlers
21st-century professional wrestlers
WWC Puerto Rico Champions
AWA International Heavyweight Champions
NWA Florida Heavyweight Champions
NWA Florida Television Champions
WCW World Tag Team Champions